The name "Belarusian Marseillaise" has been used to refer to two Belarusian patriotic songs.

Above all, "Belarusian Marseillaise" is another name for the Belarusian song "We've slept for long" the author of whose lyrics is unknown. The song was reportedly heard for the first time in 1906, "among the revolutionary peasantry of the Slutsk Uyezd, Minsk Governorate". The song was dubbed the "Belarusian Marseillaise" for the Belarusian national and revolutionary pathos of its lyrics, but was sung to a different tune than La Marseillaise. 

In late 1980s through early 1990s, the title "Belarusian Marseillaise" had also been used, occasionally, by the Belarusian national activists in relation to the song «Pahonya», with lyrics being the poem «Pahonya» by Belarusian poet Maksim Bahdanovich and the tune, indeed, that of La Marseillaise.

Lyrics of "Belarusian Marseillaise" / "We've slept for long"

Note: The song was sung with numerous variations in text.

Notes 

Belarusian songs
European anthems
La Marseillaise